Mutya ng Pilipinas 2006, the 38th edition of Mutya ng Pilipinas, Inc., was held on June 9, 2006, in Manila. Kirby Ann Basken was named the winner of Mutya ng Pilipinas Asia Pacific Int'l (Intercontinental) 2006, and Vera Eumee Reiter named as Mutya ng Pilipinas Tourism International 2007.

Results
Color keys

Special Title

Special awards

Contestants

Crossovers from major national pageants prior to this date
 Mutya #3 Vera Eumee Reiter was Binibining Pilipinas 2006 candidate
 Mutya #22 April Love Jordan was Miss Philippines Earth 2006 Top 10 semifinalist

Post-pageant notes
 Mutya ng Pilipinas Asia Pacific Int'l (Intercontinental), Kirby Ann Basken competed at Miss Intercontinental 2006 in Nassau, Bahamas and placed Top 12 semifinalist. She also became Miss Norway Universe 2007 and competed at Miss Universe 2007 but was unplaced
 Mutya ng Pilipinas Tourism Int'l, Vera Eumee Reiter competed at Miss Tourism International 2006 in Guangzhou, China but was unplaced
 Mutya ng Pilipinas 1st runner-up, Patricia Isabel Fernandez went to win Binibining Pilipinas 2008 International and Miss International 2008 Top 12 semifinalist
 Mutya ng Pilipinas 2nd Runner-up, April Love Antolo Jordan competed at Miss Tourism Queen of the Year International 2006 in Petaling Jaya, Malaysia but was unplaced. She again competed at Beauty of the World 2009 where she was crowned the winner

References

External links
 Official Mutya ng Pilipinas website
  Mutya ng Pilipinas 2007 is on!

2006 beauty pageants
2006 in the Philippines
Mutya ng Pilipinas